Jürgen Cavens (born 19 August 1978 in Broechem) is a Belgian retired footballer. He is also a former Belgian international.

Honours

Club
Lierse
 Belgian First Division A: 1996–97
 Belgian Cup: 1998–99
 Belgian Super Cup: 1997, 1999

Beerschot A.C.
 Belgian Cup: 2004–05

References

External links
 
 
 
 

1978 births
Living people
Belgian footballers
Belgium international footballers
Lierse S.K. players
Footballers from Antwerp Province
Olympique de Marseille players
Standard Liège players
FC Twente players
K.A.A. Gent players
Beerschot A.C. players
Belgian expatriate footballers
Expatriate footballers in France
Expatriate footballers in the Netherlands
Belgian Pro League players
Ligue 1 players
Eredivisie players
Challenger Pro League players
S.K. Beveren players
Royal Cappellen F.C. players
K Beerschot VA players
Association football forwards